This is a list of the Turkey national football team results from 1981 to 1999.

1981

1982

1983

1984

1985

1986

1987

1988

1989

1990

1991

1992

1993

1994

1995

1996

1997

1998

1999

Notes

Turkey national football team results